Hegyhát is a district in northern part of Baranya County. The district is located in the Southern Transdanubia Statistical Region. It is the only district in Hungarian countryside, which is not named after its district seat.

Geography 
Hegyhát District borders with Dombóvár District and Tamási District (Tolna County) to the north, Bonyhád District (Tolna County) to the east, Komló District to the southeast, Pécs District and Szentlőrinc District to the south, Szigetvár District to the southwest, Kaposvár District (Somogy County) to the northwest. The number of the inhabited places in Hegyhát District is 25.

Municipalities 
The district has 2 towns and 23 villages.
(ordered by population, as of 1 January 2012)

The bolded municipalities are cities.

See also
List of cities and towns in Hungary

References

External links
 Postal codes of the Hegyhát District

Districts in Baranya County